Elin Lundgren (born 1978) is a Swedish Social Democratic Party politician.

She was elected member of the Riksdag for the period 2010–2022, from the Gävleborg County constituency.

References

1978 births
Living people
Women members of the Riksdag
Members of the Riksdag 2010–2014
Members of the Riksdag 2014–2018
Members of the Riksdag 2018–2022
21st-century Swedish women politicians
Members of the Riksdag from the Social Democrats